Henry Lalsangzuala (born 24 January 1994) is an Indian cricketer. He made his Twenty20 debut on 11 November 2019, for Mizoram in the 2019–20 Syed Mushtaq Ali Trophy. He made his first-class debut on 4 February 2020, for Mizoram in the 2019–20 Ranji Trophy.

References

External links
 

1994 births
Living people
Indian cricketers
Mizoram cricketers
Place of birth missing (living people)